The Pakistan Islands Development Authority Ordinance (ORDINANCE NO. XI OF 2020) is an order by the president of Pakistan to establish an authority for the development and management of the islands in the internal waters and territorial waters of Pakistan. The head office is ordered to be established at Karachi, with other, regional offices authorized if the authority deems them necessary. The policy board is set at no less than five and not more than eleven members, including the chairman, with a term of office of five years. According to the terms of the ordinance, the authority has the power not only to collect taxes, but also to transfer, use, and sell the lands of the islands. Imran Ismail, the governor of Sindh, claimed that the development of the islands would "surpass Dubai."

Within 18 nautical miles, Sindh operates under its own provincial jurisdiction; the Pakistani federal government's jurisdiction starts beyond 18 nautical miles and stretches to the international seawater boundary. Regional and federal leaders have contested control of the islands since the Musharraf era. 

Sindh-based political parties, civil society organizations, and the PPP-led Sindh government expressed dismay and anger when news of the ordinance surfaced through social media on 2 October 2020. Environmentalists argue that fishermen will lose their source of income and the ecosystem will be put at risk by developing urban infrastructure on the islands. The government position is that construction will be a major boost to the nation's economy. The Ordinance was challenged in the SHC.

Reference 

Government of Pakistan

2020 in Pakistan